Careston is a hamlet in Angus, Scotland that is in the parish of the same name, 5 miles west of Brechin. The parish and hamlet supposedly took their name from a stone laid in commemoration of a Danish chieftain, called Caraldston. It has a castle and church, although the local primary school closed in 2004.

Careston railway station on the Forfar and Brechin Railway once served the hamlet.

References

Sources
Careston in the Gazetteer for Scotland.

Villages in Angus, Scotland